Hippeastrum morelianum is a species of plant of the family Amaryllidaceae found in the southwest of Brazil.

References 

morelianum
Flora of Brazil